Döhring is a surname. Notable people with the surname include:

Clara Döhring (1899–1987), German politician
Karl Döhring (1879–1941), German architect, art historian, and archaeologist
Sieghart Döhring (born 1939), German musicologist and opera researcher

See also
Dohring, another surname
Ethnonymic surnames